A Taste of Honey is a play written by Shelagh Delaney.

A Taste of Honey or Taste of Honey may refer to:
A Taste of Honey (film), a 1961 film adaptation of the play
A Taste of Honey (novella), a 2016 LGBT fantasy romance novella by Kai Ashante Wilson
Mitsu no Aji: A Taste of Honey, a Japanese television drama series

Music
A Taste of Honey (band), an American disco music group
A Taste of Honey (album), an album by A Taste of Honey
A Taste of Honey, an album by James Booker
"A Taste of Honey" (song), a 1960s pop standard, originally written for a US production of the play

See also
A Taste for Honey, a 1941 novel by H. F. Heard